Simon Kuper is a South African-British author. He writes about sports "from an anthropologic perspective."

Kuper was born in Uganda of South African parents, and moved to Leiden in the Netherlands as a child, where his father, Adam Kuper, was a lecturer in anthropology at Leiden University. He is named for his grandfather—Adam Kuper's father—who was a South African Supreme Court judge assassinated in 1963. He has lived in Stanford, California, Berlin and London. He studied History and German at Oxford University, and attended Harvard University as a Kennedy Scholar.  He now lives in Paris with his family.

He won the William Hill Sports Book of the Year in 1994 with his book Football Against the Enemy, which was later released in the United States as Soccer Against the Enemy. He has also written for The Observer and The Guardian, and is currently a sports columnist for the Financial Times.

In 2003 he published his book Ajax, The Dutch, the War: Football in Europe during the Second World War. He co-authored the 2009 book Soccernomics with Stefan Szymanski. The book put forward a formula allowing Kuper to predict that Serbia and Brazil would play the 2010 FIFA World Cup Final.

In 2022 he published Chums - How a Tiny Caste of Oxford Tories Took Over the UK, about the connections that enabled a university network to dominate Westminster.

Kuper usually writes about football, discussing the culture that surrounds it — such as the Old Firm rivalry — as well as the on-field play. He has written on cricket occasionally, with articles on cricket in the Netherlands and cricket in apartheid South Africa.

Kuper also writes in Dutch, and his work frequently appeared in publications including the Dutch newspaper De Pers, the literary football magazine Hard Gras, and opinion magazine Vrij Nederland.

References

External links
 Simon Kuper short biography in Financial Times web site
 

1969 births
Living people
British male writers
Dutch male writers
British sports journalists
People from Kampala
People from Leiden
Alumni of the University of Oxford
Harvard University alumni
Kennedy Scholarships